Merilappi United is women's association football club from Kemi, Finland. It was founded in October 2011 as a merger of two local clubs, Kemin Into and Visan Pallo. Merilappi United plays in the Finnish women's premier division Naisten Liiga.

References

External links 
 

Women's football clubs in Finland
Kemi
Association football clubs established in 2011
2011 establishments in Finland